Dudley is an English toponymic surname associated with the town of Dudley in West Midlands, England. Notable people with the surname include:

 Ambrose Dudley, 3rd Earl of Warwick (c. 1530 – 1590), English general and patron of moderate Puritanism
 Andrew Dudley (c. 1507 – 1559), English soldier and courtier
 Anne Dudley (born 1956), English composer and pop musician
 Anne Dudley, maiden name of American poet Anne Bradstreet (c. 1612 – 1672)
 Benjamin Winslow Dudley (1785–1870), American surgeon and academic in Kentucky.
 Bill Dudley (1921–2010), American football player
 Billy Dudley (1931–1980), Nigerian political scientist
 Bob Dudley (born 1955), Chief Executive Officer of BP
 Carl Dudley (1910–1973), American film director and producer
 Charles Benjamin Dudley (1842–1909), American chemist
 Chris Dudley (born 1965), American basketball player
 Dave Dudley (1928–2003), American country singer
 Doc Dudley (1894–1975), Negro league baseball player
 Doris Dudley (1917-1965), American actress
 Dudd Dudley (1600–1684), pioneer English metallurgist
 Ed Dudley (1901–1963), American golfer
 Edmund Dudley (c. 1462 or 1471/1472–1510), English politician in the Tudor period
 Edward Bishop Dudley (1789–1855), American politician, 28th governor of North Carolina
 Ernest Dudley (1908–2006), British writer
 George Dudley (1894–1960), Canadian ice hockey administrator and Hockey Hall of Fame inductee
 Lord Guildford Dudley (c. 1535 – 1554), husband of Lady Jane Grey
 Helena Dudley (1858–1932) American social worker, labor organizer, and pacifist
 Henry Sutton Dudley (1517–1568), English soldier, sailor, diplomat, and conspirator
 Homer Dudley (1896–1987), American inventor of the vocoder.
 James Dudley (1910–2004), American baseball player and professional wrestling manager and executive
 James B. Dudley (1859–1925), president of North Carolina Agricultural and Technical State University
 Jane Dudley (1912–2001), American dancer, choreographer and teacher
 Jane Dudley, Duchess of Northumberland (1508/1509–1555), wife of John Dudley, 1st Duke of Northumberland
 Janet Dudley-Eshbach, President of Salisbury University, Maryland
 Jared Dudley (born 1985), American basketball player
 Jimmy Dudley (1909–1999), American sportscaster
 John Dudley, 1st Duke of Northumberland (1504–1553), English general, admiral and politician noted for trying to place Lady Jane Grey on the throne of England
 John Dudley, 2nd Earl of Warwick (c. 1527 – 1554), son of the 1st Duke of Northumberland
 Joseph Dudley (1647–1720), a colonial governor of Massachusetts, son of Thomas Dudley
 Katherine Hastings, Countess of Huntingdon (died 1620), daughter of the 1st Duke of Northumberland
 Margaret Johnson Erwin Dudley (1821–1863), American plantation owner
 Marion Dudley (1972–2006), American murderer
 Mary Dudley, Lady Sidney (c. 1530–1586), English lady-in-waiting, mother of Sir Philip Sydney
 Sir Matthew Dudley (1661–1721), English politician
 Nathan Dudley (1825–1910), acting brigadier general for the Union Army in the American Civil War
 Owen Francis Dudley (1882–1952) English novelist and Priest
 Paul Dudley (jurist) (1675–1751), Attorney General of Massachusetts, son of Joseph Dudley
 Paul Dudley (American football) (born 1939)
 Peter Dudley (1935–1983), English character actor
 Richard M. Dudley (1938–2020), mathematics professor at the Massachusetts Institute of Technology
 Rick Dudley (born 1949), Canadian ice hockey player and coach
 Robert Charles Dudley (1826–1900), British painter.
 Robert Dudley, 1st Earl of Leicester (1532–1588), favourite and suitor of Queen Elizabeth I
 Robert Dudley (explorer) (1574–1649), English explorer and cartographer
 Roger Dudley (between 1535 and 1545–1586?/1590), English soldier
 Sherman H. Dudley (1872–1940), American vaudeville performer and producer, theater owner
 Terence Dudley (1919–1988), British television director and producer
 Theodore Robert Dudley (1936–1994), American botanist
 Thomas Dudley (1576–1653), colonial magistrate and governor of the Massachusetts Bay Colony
 Underwood Dudley (born 1937), American mathematician
 Uriah Dudley (1852–1909), mine manager in Australia
 William Dudley (colonel) (1766–1813), Kentucky militia officer in the War of 1812
 William Dudley (bishop) (died 1483), Bishop of Durham
 William C. Dudley (born 1952), economist at the New York Federal Reserve
 William Edward Dudley (1868–1938), administrator in the British co-operative movement
 William S. Dudley (born 1936), U.S. naval historian
 William Wade Dudley (1842–1909), American soldier, lawyer and politician
 Members of The Dudley Brothers, a professional wrestling stable (all American, with real names next to their lifespans):
 Big Dick Dudley (1968–2002; Alex Rizzo)
 Bubba Ray Dudley (born 1971; Mark LoMonaco)
 Chubby Dudley (born c. 1970; Bay Ragni)
 D-Von Dudley (born 1972; Devon Hughes)
 Dances with Dudley (born c. 1970; Adolfo Bermudez)
 Dudley Dudley (wrestler) (born 1968; Jeff Bradley)
 Sign Guy Dudley (born 1970; Lou D'Angeli), wrestling manager and later a marketing executive outside of wrestling
 Snot Dudley (born 1970; Michael Deek)
 Spike Dudley (born 1970; Matthew Hyson)

See also 
 
 Dudley (disambiguation)

References 

English-language surnames
English toponymic surnames